Teltow is a town in Brandenburg, Germany.

Teltow may also refer to:

 Teltow (region), a geological plateau and historic cultural landscape in Brandenburg, Germany
 , a former county in Brandenburg, Germany
 Landkreis Teltow-Fläming, a county in Brandenburg, Germany
 Teltow Canal, canal in Berlin and Brandenburg, Germany
 the Teltow river, in Berlin und Brandenburg (largely part of the Teltow Canal), see Telte (Bäke)
 Teltow War an internal German war between the Houses of Ascania and Wettin in the 1240s
 Teltow Shipyard, a former shipyard in Berlin
 Teltow (ship), a tug